"Nessaja" is a song written by Peter Maffay and Rolf Zuckowski from the musical Tabaluga released in 1983 on the album Tabaluga oder die Reise zur Vernunft. German band Scooter released a version as single on 8 April 2002. It features as a bonus track on the group's first live album, Encore: Live and Direct, and was the first Scooter single to feature newest member at that time Jay Frog. The pitch shifted female vocals are performed by Nicole Sukar. "Nessaja" became Scooter's first and only number-one single in Germany and reached number two in Austria, Norway, and Romania. In the United Kingdom, the song peaked at number four on the UK Singles Chart.

Music video
The music video for Nessaja opens with a limousine pulling up outside a large white mansion. Women in dresses and men in suits get out of the car and go inside the house. Many people are waiting for a 'show' to start behind a red curtain. When the music starts, H.P. Baxxter comes out from behind the curtain and starts rapping. The people start dancing and then there are some shots of women dressed in underwear and rabbit ears in the same room (although it is empty). The video comes back to Scooter for a while, then cuts back to the two women, who are now topless. The women are later seen in bathtubs, again naked. The rest of the video shows H.P. Baxxter rapping and people dancing and partying. At the end of the video there is confetti on the floor and everyone is asleep, apart from Scooter, who then leave in a limousine.

Track listings

German CD single
 "Nessaja" (radio edit) – 3:28
 "Nessaja" (extended) – 5:18
 "Nessaja" (The Ultimate Clubmix) – 7:09
 "Shortbread" – 3:55

German limited-edition CD single
 "Nessaja" (radio edit) – 3:28
 "Nessaja" (extended) – 5:18
 "Nessaja" (The Ultimate Clubmix) – 7:09
 "Nessaja" (Topmodelz mix) – 5:40
 "Nessaja" (the video—uncensored version) – 3:28

European CD single
 "Nessaja" – 3:28
 "Nessaja" (The Ultimate Clubmix) – 7:09

European 12-inch single
A1. "Nessaja" (extended) – 5:18
B1. "Nessaja" (Ultimate club mix) – 7:09
B2. "Nessaja" (Topmodelz mix) – 5:40

UK CD single
 "Nessaja" (radio edit) – 3:28
 "Nessaja" (Clubstar UK remix) – 7:28
 "Nessaja" (Flip & Fill remix) – 6:16
 "Nessaja" (video UK edit) – 3:26

UK 12-inch single
A1. "Nessaja" (Clubstar UK remix) – 7:23
B1. "Nessaja" (Flip & Fill remix) – 6:14
B2. "Nessaja" (extended mix) – 5:18

UK cassette single
 "Nessaja" (radio edit) – 3:28
 "Nessaja" (Flip & Fill remix) – 6:14

Australian CD single
 "Nessaja" (radio edit)
 "Nessaja" (Clubstar UK remix)
 "Nessaja" (Flip & Fill remix)
 "Nessaja" (extended mix)
 "Nessaja" (Ultimate club mix)

Charts and certifications

Weekly charts

Year-end charts

Certifications

Release history

In popular culture
Scooter's version of "Nessaja" featured in the opening credits of the 2009 film Brüno. The song was also featured in a scene of Episode 6 "GNVQ" of the BBC sitcom "This Country" and in a scene in Season 1, Episode 13 "Pyramid Scheme" of the American remake Welcome to Flatch.

References

1983 singles
1983 songs
2002 singles
Number-one singles in Germany
Peter Maffay songs
Scooter (band) songs
Songs written by Gerry Rafferty
Songs written by H.P. Baxxter
Songs written by Jens Thele
Songs written by Rick J. Jordan
UK Independent Singles Chart number-one singles